Poonam Khetrapal Singh (Hindi: पूनम खेत्रपाल सिंह)  is the first Indian elected Regional Director of WHO’s South-East Asia Region. She was also the first woman in the region to assume the office of WHO Regional Director for South-East Asia in February 2014. In September 2018, she was unanimously elected for a second five-year term by the 71st Regional Committee and 144th Session of the WHO Executive Board.

Education and early career 
Singh has a PhD in Public Health and is a Fellow of the Royal College of Physicians (FRCP) of the University of Edinburgh.

Prior to her service as Regional Director of the WHO South-East Asia Region, for over two decades she was a civil servant in India as a member of the Indian Administrative Services (IAS) belonging to the 1975 Batch. This included roles as Secretary of the Department of Health and Family Welfare; Secretary of the Department of Personnel and General Administration; Managing Director of Punjab Financial Corporation and Punjab Industrial development corporations in the State of Punjab. She has also worked in the Health, Population and Nutrition Department of The World Bank and joined WHO headquarters in 1998 as Executive Director, Sustainable Development and Healthy Environments Cluster, and a member of the Director-General’s Cabinet. Dr Singh was the first Indian Women to serve as an Executive Director at WHO headquarters in Geneva. In February 2013, she joined the Government of India’s Ministry of Health & Family Welfare as Advisor for International Health, where her principal task was to strengthen global health outcomes and to take forward the international health agenda.

Regional Director of WHO South-East Asia 
Singh’s term as the Regional Director of the South-East Asia Region of World Health Organization is defined by the maxim "Sustain. Accelerate. Innovate." Each word complements her original "One by Four" plan and the seven (later eight) Flagship Priorities that, since 2014, anchored region-wide progress.

Selected works and publications 

 Khetrapal Singh P, Jhalani M. Safeguarding essential health services during emergencies: lessons learnt from the COVID-19 pandemic. WHO South East Asia J Public Health. 2020 Sep;9(2):93-94. doi: 10.4103/2224-3151.293433. PMID 32978338.
 Khetrapal Singh P, Ofrin RH. Quo vadis after COVID-19: a new path for global emergency preparedness? WHO South East Asia J Public Health. 2020 Apr;9(1):1-4. doi: 10.4103/2224-3151.282988. PMID 32341214.
 Singh PK. The research community must meet the coronavirus disease 2019 challenge. Indian J Med Res. 2020 Feb & Mar;151(2 & 3):116-117. doi: 10.4103/ijmr.IJMR_832_20. PMID 32270770; PMCID: PMC7357404.
 Singh PK. Sustain, accelerate, innovate: the burden of liver disease and way forward in the WHO South-East Asia region. Lancet Gastroenterol Hepatol. 2020 Feb;5(2):100-102. doi: 10.1016/S2468-1253(19)30318-8. Epub 2019 Dec 15. PMID 31852631.
 Singh PK, Landry M. Harnessing the potential of digital health in the WHO South-East Asia Region: sustaining what works, accelerating scale-up and innovating frontier technologies. WHO South East Asia J Public Health. 2019 Sep;8(2):67-70. doi: 10.4103/2224-3151.264848. PMID 31441439.
 Arinaminpathy N, Mandal S, Bhatia V, McLeod R, Sharma M, Swaminathan S, Hyder KA, Mandal PP, Sarkar SK, Singh PK. Strategies for ending tuberculosis in the South-East Asian Region: A modelling approach. Indian J Med Res. 2019 Apr;149(4):517-527. doi: 10.4103/ijmr.IJMR_1901_18. PMID 31411176; PMCID: PMC6676838.
 Khetrapal Singh P, Travis P. Time to deliver: accelerating more equitable access to better quality primary health-care services in the WHO South-East Asia Region. WHO South East Asia J Public Health. 2019 Apr;8(1):1-3. doi: 10.4103/2224-3151.255341. PMID 30950422.
 Khetrapal Singh P, Travis P. Accelerating access to essential medicines in the WHO South-East Asia Region: opportunities for greater engagement and better evidence. WHO South East Asia J Public Health. 2018 Sep;7(2):59-61. doi: 10.4103/2224-3151.239414. PMID 30136661.
 Qadri F, Azad AK, Flora MS, Khan AI, Islam MT, Nair GB, Singh PK, Clemens JD. Emergency deployment of oral cholera vaccine for the Rohingya in Bangladesh. Lancet. 2018 May 12;391(10133):1877-1879. doi: 10.1016/S0140-6736(18)30993-0. Epub 2018 May 10. PMID 29781432.
 Singh PK, Travis P. Universal health coverage in the World Health Organization South-East Asia Region: how can we make it "business unusual"? WHO South East Asia J Public Health. 2018 Apr;7(1):1-4. doi: 10.4103/2224-3151.228420. PMID 29582842.
 Singh PK. Towards ending viral hepatitis as a public health threat: translating new momentum into concrete results in South-East Asia. Gut Pathog. 2018 Mar 5;10:9. doi: 10.1186/s13099-018-0237-x. PMID 29515657; PMCID: PMC5836424.
 Sundar S, Khetrapal-Singh P, Frampton J, Trimble E, Rajaraman P, Mehrotra R, Hariprasad R, Maitra A, Gill P, Suri V, Srinivasan R, Singh G, Thakur JS, Dhillon P, Cazier JB. Harnessing genomics to improve outcomes for women with cancer in India: key priorities for research. Lancet Oncol. 2018 Feb;19(2):e102-e112. doi: 10.1016/S1470-2045(17)30726-X. Erratum in: Lancet Oncol. 2018 Jun;19(6):e283. PMID 29413464.
 Singh PK, Thamarangsi T. Accelerating tobacco control in South-East Asia in the sustainable development goal era. Indian J Public Health. 2017 Sep;61(Suppl 1):S1-S2. doi: 10.4103/ijph.IJPH_229_17. PMID 28928310.
 Singh PK. Global response to combat antimicrobial resistance. Indian J Med Microbiol. 2017 Jan-Mar;35(1):1-3. doi: 10.4103/ijmm.IJMM_17_98. PMID 28303809.
 Nadda JP, Singh PK. New evidence of the tuberculosis burden in Asia demands national action. Lancet. 2016 Nov 5;388(10057):2217-2219. doi: 10.1016/S0140-6736(16)31853-0. Epub 2016 Oct 14. PMID 27751565.
 Senaratne R, Singh PK. Against the odds, Sri Lanka eliminates malaria. Lancet. 2016 Sep 10;388(10049):1038-1039. doi: 10.1016/S0140-6736(16)31572-0. Epub 2016 Sep 6. PMID 27613520.
 Sidibé M, Singh PK. Thailand eliminates mother-to-child transmission of HIV and syphilis. Lancet. 2016 Jun 18;387(10037):2488-9. doi: 10.1016/S0140-6736(16)30787-5. Epub 2016 Jun 9. PMID 27291996.
 Singh PK. Progress in health-related millennium development goals in the WHO South-East Asia Region. Indian J Public Health. 2012 Oct-Dec;56(4):259-68. doi: 10.4103/0019-557X.106412. PMID 23354135.
 Sinha DN, Singh PK, Thakur J. Trend of tobacco use and exposure to secondhand smoke among students aged 13–15 years in India and selected countries of the South-East Asia region. Indian J Community Med. 2011 Dec;36(Suppl 1):S78-80. doi: 10.4103/0970-0218.94714. PMID 22628918; PMCID: PMC3354907.
 Singh PK, Ofrin R, Ravindran P, Paturussi I, Yasir I, Aung T, Kahandailyanage HA, Kunaratanapruk S. Session 1.2: national health perspectives of the Tsunami crisis. Prehosp Disaster Med. 2005 Nov-Dec;20(6):382-4. doi: 10.1017/s1049023x00002922. PMID 16496617.

References 

World Health Organization officials
Living people
Indian Administrative Service officers
1949 births